The 2015 National Invitation Tournament was a single-elimination tournament of 32 NCAA Division I teams that were not selected to participate in the 2015 NCAA tournament. The annual tournament is being played on campus sites for the first three rounds, with the Final Four and Championship game being held at Madison Square Garden in New York City. The tournament began on Tuesday, March 17 and ended on Thursday, April 2. On February 6, the NCAA announced the 2015 NIT will use a 30-second shot clock (same as its WNIT counterpart) and a 4-foot (1.22 m) restricted-area arc as experimental rules for the 2015 tournament. On March 4, the NCAA announced teams that are marked as the first four teams left out of the 2015 NCAA tournament field will be the top-seeded teams in the 2015 NIT.

Participants

Automatic qualifiers
The following teams earned automatic berths into the 2015 NIT field by virtue of having won their respective conference's regular season championship but failing to win their conference tournaments or receive an at-large NCAA bid.

At-large bids
The following 20 teams were also awarded NIT berths.

Seeds

Schedule

*Game times in Eastern Time. #Rankings denote tournament seeding.

Bracket
The following teams were listed as the "First Four Out" of the NCAA Tournament and received #1 seeds: Old Dominion, Richmond, Temple, Colorado State.

#3 Illinois played at #6 Alabama due to State Farm Center renovations.

* Denotes overtime period

Media
ESPN, Inc. has exclusive television rights to all NIT games. It will telecast every game across ESPN, ESPN2, ESPNU and ESPN3. Since 2011, Westwood One has held exclusive radio rights to the semifinals and championship. In 2015, Dave Ryan and Kelly Tripucka will call these games for Westwood One.

See also
 2015 Women's National Invitation Tournament
 2015 NCAA Division I men's basketball tournament
 2015 NCAA Division II men's basketball tournament
 2015 NCAA Division III men's basketball tournament
 2015 NCAA Division I women's basketball tournament
 2015 NCAA Division II women's basketball tournament
 2015 NCAA Division III women's basketball tournament
 2015 NAIA Division I men's basketball tournament
 2015 NAIA Division II men's basketball tournament
 2015 NAIA Division I women's basketball tournament
 2015 NAIA Division II women's basketball tournament
 2015 College Basketball Invitational
 2015 CollegeInsider.com Postseason Tournament

References

National Invitation
National Invitation Tournament
2010s in Manhattan
National Invitation Tournament
Basketball in New York City
College sports in New York City
Madison Square Garden
National Invitation Tournament
National Invitation Tournament
Sports competitions in New York City
Sports in Manhattan